Pleuridium may refer to:
 Pleuridium (plant), a genus of mosses in the family Ditrichaceae
 Pleuridium, a genus of flowering plants in the family Polypodiaceae; synonym of Campyloneurum
 Pleuridium, a genus of beetles in the family Teredidae, synonym of Sosylus